List of the Islamic falak location spots in Malaysia.

Falak locations
 

Falak
Falak locations